Aminonaphthalenesulfonic acids are compounds with the composition C10H6(NH2)(SO3H), being derived from naphthalene (C10H8) substituted by an amino and sulfonic acid groups.  These compounds are colorless solids.  They are useful precursors to dyes.

Notes: Peri-acid dehydrates to the sultam.  Via the Bucherer reaction, heating periacid with anilinium salts gives the N-phenyl derivative, precursor to Acid Blue 113.

References

Naphthalenesulfonic acids
Amino acids